The president of the Chamber of Deputies of Chile is the highest authority of the Chamber of Deputies of Chile. The office was established in 1811 by the First National Congress of Chile.

It is third on the presidential line of succession after the minister of the interior and public security and the president of the Senate of Chile (Constitution, Art. 29).

The office is currently held by Vlado Mirosevic of the Liberal Party (PL). He was elected on 7 November 2022. Karol Cariola's term as President of the Chamber of Deputies will then take place, after which the remaining three presidencies will be shared between Miguel Ángel Calisto (DC), Yovana Ahumada (PDG) and the Broad Front (FA). Likewise, the first and second vice-presidencies were assigned to people who are members of the PR, FA, PS, PC, DC and PPD.

Election 
The directive board of the Chamber of Deputies of Chile is composed of a president, a first vice president and a second vice president. They are elected by an absolute majority in a secret ballot.

The president and Vice presidents of the chamber can be reelected.

In case of a resignation from office by the president of the Chamber, if accepted by the Chamber of Deputies, new elections will be held on a congressional session forty five hours after the position was left vacant.

History

Patria Vieja (1810–1814) 

The first president of the Chamber of Deputies of Chile was Juan Antonio Ovalle, a lawyer and landowner who had previously served as procurator of Santiago. He was elected as deputy for Santiago with 343 votes and appointed president of the unicameral First National Congress of Chile. He held office for 16 days before being replaced by Martín Calvo Encalada who had been serving as deputy for Curicó.

On September 4, 1811, revolutionary José Miguel Carrera, with the support of his siblings, led a successful coup d'état with the goal of establishing a more radical government. Joaquín Larraín, a co-conspirator of the coup, was appointed new president of the chamber of deputies as congress went on to pass several reforms.

Relations between José Miguel Carrera and other co-conspirators rapidly worsened which led the Carrera family to carry out a second coup d'état on November 15. Congress continued operating until December 2 when Carrera ordered its dissolution.

Congress was reinstated in 1812, being composed solely by the Senate of Chile which would cease to exist in 1814 following the Chilean defeat at the Battle of Rancagua.

Patria Nueva (1817–1823) 

Supreme Director Bernardo O'Higgins reinstated congress in 1818 as a unicameral legislative body composed by the Senate of Chile. A bicameral system was stablished in 1822 following the creation of a new constitution, the new legislative body was composed of a Senate and a Chamber of Deputies. The bicameral system could not implemented due to the political turmoil in the country following the resignation and self-exile of O'Higgins on January 28, 1823.

A new constitution was drafted in 1823 during the government of Supreme Director Ramón Freire which stablished a unicameral legislative body formed by the Senate of Chile.

Chilean Civil War of 1891 

By 1891, several disputes between the executive and legislative branches led to an uprising by Congress with the goal of deposing the liberal government in power.

President of the Chamber Ramón Barros Luco was one of signatories of the act of destitution of President José Manuel Balmaceda, which instigated the Chilean Navy to rebel against the government in support of the Congressist uprising.

Barros Luco was a member of the Revolutionary Junta of Iquique which administered parts of the country that were occupied by the Congressist band during the civil war. Following the congressist victory, Barros Luco participated in another government junta which oversaw parliamentary and municipal elections.

Military dictatorship (1973–1990) 

Congress was dissolved following the 1973 coup d'état that ousted President Salvador Allende. A military junta led by commander-in-chief of the Chilean Army general Augusto Pinochet was stablished.

Luis Pareto served as the last president of the Chamber of Deputies prior to the dissolution of Congress. He was a proponent of the August 23, 1973 accord which accused the Allende administration of seizing power with the goal of establishing a totalitarian government contrary to the democratic values of the Chilean constitution.

Presidential Republic (1990–present) 

Congress was reinstated in March 1990 during the Chilean transition to democracy. Presidential and Parliamentary elections were held in December 1989.

María Maluenda, a human rights advocate and former ambassador to Vietnam, served as provisional president of the Chamber of Deputies during its inaugural session before the election of José Antonio Viera-Gallo.

In 2008, President of the Chamber Juan Bustos died of liver cancer. Following his death, President Michelle Bachelet declared three days of national mourning. His duties were surrogated to First Vice President of the Chamber Guillermo Ceroni who served as provisional president for a week until the election of Francisco Encina.

In November 2019 several deputies requested then-President of the Chamber Iván Flores to resign following his decision to suspend activities on a day during the ongoing 2019–2020 Chilean protests which they deemed as damaging to the public image of Congress. Later that month, Flores' office in Valparaíso was attacked by protestors who threw rocks at the building.

In April 2020 Diego Paulsen became the youngest person to hold the position at 32 years old.

Role 

The president's principal duty is to preside over the Chamber and maintain order. In case of disarray, the president may request attendees to leave, as well as call for assistance from Carabineros with the purpose of maintaining or re-establishing order in the Chamber.

The president of the Chamber has the capacity to declare the inadmissibility of bills or constitutional reforms that infringe Art. 65 of the Constitution of Chile which grants exclusive capability to the president of the Republic to propose constitutional reforms that alter the current political, administrative or fiscal divisions of the country.

Form of address 

The president of the Chamber of Deputies is given the title "His Excellency" which is only used formally or in official documents. The title "The Honorable" is given to all members of the Chamber of Deputies, including its president.

The president should be referred to in third person like the rest of the members of the Chamber.

Presidents of the Chamber of Deputies of Chile

Presidential Republic (1990–present)

Timeline

Presidential Republic (1990–present)

See also
 National Congress of Chile
 President of the Senate of Chile

References

Chile, Chamber of Deputies
Politics of Chile